The Following is a list of Liberian writers.

A
 Mae Azango

B
 Joseph Bartuah
 Kenneth Best (born 1938) 
 Edward Wilmot Blyden (1832–1912)
 Martina Brooks (born 1983)

C
 Helene Cooper (born 1966)

D
 Roland T. Dempster (1910–1965)
 Abdullah Dukuly

F
 Henry Boimah Fahnbulleh (born 1949)

G
 Leymah Gbowee (born 1972)
 Hawa Jande Golakai (born 1979)

H
 Musue Noha Haddad

K
 Knero (born 1985)

L
 Ophelia S. Lewis (born 1961)

M
 Fatima Massaquoi (1912–1978)
 Clarence Moniba (born 1979)
 Bai T. Moore (1916–1988)
 Wayétu Moore (born 1985)
 Samuel C. Morrison Jr. (born 1982)

P
 Albert Porte (1937–2009)

S
 Wilton G. S. Sankawulo (1937–2009)
 Vamba Sherif (born 1973)
 Rodney Sieh
 Michaela Songa (born 1986)

T
 Hilary Teague (1832–1912)

W
 Joseph Jeffrey Walters (c. 1860–1894)
 Patricia Jabbeh Wesley
 Gabriel I. H. Williams
 Samuel Kofi Woods (born 1964)

See also
List of African writers by country

References

Liberian
Writers